Claire Shipman is an American television journalist, formerly the senior national correspondent for ABC's Good Morning America. She is married to Jay Carney, President Barack Obama's former White House Press Secretary. She is also Vice Chair of the Board of Trustees of Columbia University.

Life and career 
Shipman, born October 4, 1962, in Washington, D.C., is the daughter of the late Christie (Armstrong) and Morgan Enlow Shipman, Professor of Law at The Ohio State University, Moritz College of Law.  > She graduated from Worthington High School in Worthington, Ohio, in 1980. In 2006, she was recognized by Worthington Schools as a Distinguished Alumna during Convocation. She is a 1986 graduate of Columbia College of Columbia University and also holds a master's degree from Columbia's School of International and Public Affairs.

She is divorced from former CNN Moscow bureau chief Steve Hurst. She and her second husband, Jay Carney, have a son and daughter. Carney was the White House press secretary from January 27, 2011, to June 20, 2014. She claims that her husband gave her no indication that the secret operation that led to the killing of Osama bin Laden was under way in Pakistan.

Claire Shipman is a journalist, author and public speaker. She has written three New York Times bestselling books, The Confidence Code, The Confidence Code for Girls, and Womenomics. Her co-author on all three has been the BBC's Katty Kay.

Shipman was with ABC News for 15 years, reporting on politics, international affairs to social issues. Before moving to ABC, she covered the White House and the Clinton administration for NBC news. Shipman also spent a decade at CNN, where she covered the White House, and spent five years at CNN’s Moscow bureau covering the collapse of the Soviet Union. She’s received numerous awards for her reporting, including a Peabody, a DuPont and an Emmy.  Shipman holds a graduate degree in international affairs from the School of International and Public Affairs at Columbia University and a Bachelors of Arts in Russian Studies from Columbia College. 
On June 2, 2009, HarperCollins published Womenomics, a book written by Shipman and BBC World News America correspondent Katty Kay exploring the redefinition of success for working women based on recent trends in the value of women to the business world.

In March 2022, the Institute on Holistic Wealth, Founded By Best-Selling Author Keisha Blair, Announced that Claire Shipman, was selected to be a Holistic Wealth Trailblazer, as part of the celebration of the release of Keisha Blair’s book Holistic Wealth Expanded and Updated.

Recognition 

Shipman received a Peabody Award and the medal "Defender of a Free Russia" for her work covering the 1991 Soviet coup and the subsequent dissolution of the Soviet Union.

References

External links
 ABCNews biography
 
 

American television reporters and correspondents
Living people
American women television journalists
ABC News personalities
Peabody Award winners
People from Worthington, Ohio
School of International and Public Affairs, Columbia University alumni
20th-century American journalists
21st-century American journalists
1962 births
Columbia College (New York) alumni
Journalists from Ohio
Journalists from Washington, D.C.
21st-century American women
20th-century American women